is a joshi puroresu (women's professional wrestling) promotion established in 2006 by Emi Sakura, after her split with Gatokunyan.

History

Ice Ribbon was founded by Emi Sakura, a professional wrestler who was active with IWA Japan and FMW in the 1990s as Emi Motokawa. Ice Ribbon split off from Gatokunyan, Sakura's previous promotion, and held their first card on June 20, 2006 in Tokyo.

The promotion built their own dojo in Warabi, Saitama. Ice Ribbon's early shows mainly took place at the Saitama dojo, referred to by the promotion as the "Isami Wrestle Arena", while several larger annual events, like Golden Ribbon and RibbonMania, began being held at Korakuen Hall in Tokyo.

The early roster of Ice Ribbon was made up of wrestlers who transferred from Gatokunyan. The promotion's roster began to expand through collaborations with a TV program called "Muscle Venus" and the 2009 film, "Three Count". As part of these collaborations, Ice Ribbon recruited and trained several actresses as wrestlers. Among the actresses trained by Ice Ribbon, Hikaru Shida, Miyako Matsumoto, and Tsukasa Fujimoto remained active as wrestlers. Ice Ribbon additionally gained attention for training and debuting children as wrestlers. For example, Ice Ribbon wrestlers Riho and Hiragi Kurumi made their debuts at the age of nine, while Hikari Minami and Tsukushi were eleven and twelve, respectively, when they made their debuts. Some of the children who made their professional wrestling debuts as part of Ice Ribbon, such as Aoi Kizuki, Makoto, Moeka Haruhi, Kurumi, and Riho, are still active as wrestlers.

In 2009, Ice Ribbon was sold to Neoplus. On May 28, 2010, Ice Ribbon announced a new project called , an internet streaming program on Ustream. The show aired Fridays at 19:00 Japan time (10:00 UTC). The original concept of the show saw Ice Ribbon rookie Sayaka Obihiro being assigned full-time to the project and facing Ice Ribbon wrestlers in weekly matches. The concept was abandoned on August 26, 2011, when the project was officially brought under the Ice Ribbon banner, with Obihiro again becoming a regular member of the Ice Ribbon roster and the 19 O'Clock Girls ProWrestling turning into a regular professional wrestling program with no distinct concept.

From its inception, Ice Ribbon had a close relationship with NEO Japan Ladies Pro Wrestling, which saw Ice Ribbon wrestlers Emi Sakura, Aoi Kizuki and Makoto make regular appearances for the promotion, while NEO wrestlers like Etsuko Mita, Tanny Mouse and Yoshiko Tamura also made several appearances for Ice Ribbon. The relationship lasted until NEO folded on December 31, 2010, with Emi Sakura, Hikaru Shida, Makoto and Tsukasa Fujimoto appearing at the promotion's final event. Starting in late 2010, Ice Ribbon was involved in a year-long interpromotional storyline rivalry with the Sendai Girls' Pro Wrestling promotion, which saw Ice Ribbon and Sendai Girls' wrestlers make regular appearances for the opposing promotion. Through its relationships with American promotion Chikara and the British Pro-Wrestling: EVE, Ice Ribbon's wrestlers have also made appearances in the United States and the United Kingdom. Ice Ribbon has additionally had close relationships with the DDT Pro-Wrestling (DDT), Big Japan Pro Wrestling (BJW), JWP Joshi Puroresu, Pro Wrestling Wave, and Reina Joshi Puroresu promotions.

On December 14, 2011, Ice Ribbon's founder Emi Sakura announced that she was leaving the promotion for "personal reasons" following the January 7, 2012, event in Sendai. Following Sakura's departure, Hikaru Shida and Tsukasa Fujimoto took over the training duties at the Ice Ribbon dojo. In 2012, Ray, Sayaka Obihiro, and Ice Ribbon dojo graduates Hikari Minami and Riho also left Ice Ribbon, while Dorami Nagano took a sabbatical to concentrate on her studies. To combat the decreasing number of wrestlers on its active roster, Ice Ribbon introduced the first six wrestlers trained by Hikaru Shida and Tsukasa Fujimoto: Eri Wakamatsu, Fumiko Sato, Risa Okuda, Rutsuko Yamaguchi, Oshima Kujira and Shoko Hotta. Wakamatsu and Hotta, along with Ayano Takeda and Hiroko Terada, two other Shida and Fujimoto trainees who debuted before the end of 2012, all ended their professional wrestling careers by April 2013. Trainee Risa Sera (previously known as Risa Okuda) is still active in wrestling.

In February 2012, Ice Ribbon formed a partnership with Japanese pop group hy4_4yh (Hyper Yo-yo). The partnership led to the group making musical appearances at Ice Ribbon events, performing Maki Narumiya's new entrance theme and, on March 7, the two promoting the first "Hyper Ribbon" event, which featured both matches and musical performances. On December 12, 2012, Neoplus officially announced the creation of Corazon Joshi Puroresu, Ice Ribbon's sister promotion, which features a more theatrical take on professional wrestling. Following Sayaka Obihiro's December 2012 departure from Ice Ribbon, the promotion put 19 O'Clock Girls ProWrestling on hiatus as it considered the future of the program. On January 4, 2014, Ice Ribbon was dealt another blow, when Hikaru Shida announced she was also leaving the promotion the following March. On January 22, longtime freelancer Mio Shirai signed a contract with Ice Ribbon. Following her September 2015 retirement, she became a referee and trainer for Ice Ribbon. On January 3, 2016, Ice Ribbon Aoi Kizuki announced her departure from the promotion.

In March 2017, Hana Date, Karen Date, Nao Date and Nori Date, four mixed martial artists representing Team Date, signed with Ice Ribbon. In 2018, Team Date's contracts with Ice Ribbon expired.

In February 2021, the Ice Ribbon dojo hosted the Warabi Regional bracket for United States-based All Elite Wrestling (AEW)'s Women's World Championship Eliminator Tournament. The tournament was broken into two separate brackets, with eight women competing in matches in the Jacksonville Regional bracket and eight women competing in Ice Ribbon's Warabi Regional bracket. The winner of each bracket will then face each other in the tournament final on AEW Dynamite to determine the overall winner, with the overall tournament winner facing Ice Ribbon alumni Hikaru Shida for the AEW Women's World Championship at Revolution. The tournament was won by Ryo Mizunami.

In September 2021, president of Ice Ribbon Hajime Sato appeared alongside Kounosuke Izui, promoter of Lady's Ring, on an episode of CMLL Informa to announce the establishment of a working relationship between the two promotions and the Mexican-based Consejo Mundial de Lucha Libre (CMLL).

Roster

Wrestlers

Alumni/notable guests

Female

 235
 Aika Ando 
 Aja Kong
 Akane Fujita
 Akari
 Ami Miura
 Aoi Kizuki
 Arisa Nakajima
 Azumi Hyuga
 Chii Tomiya
 Crea
 Dorami Nagano
 Gami
 Giulia
 Haruka Umesaki 
 Hikari Minami
 Hikari Shimizu 
 Hikaru Shida
 Hiragi Kurumi
 Hiroe Nagahama
 Itsuki Aoki
 Kaho Kobayashi
 Kaoru Ito
 Mai Sakurai
 Kiyoko Ichiki
 Maika Ozaki 
 Maki Narumiya
 Makoto
 Maria
 Maruko Nagasaki
 Matsuya Uno
 Maya Yukihi
 Mayumi Ozaki 
 Michiko Miyagi
 Mika Iida
 Miku Aono
 Mio Shirai
 Misae Genki
 Miyako Matsumoto
 Miyuki Takase
 Mochi Miyagi
 Momo Kohgo
 Nanae Takahashi
 Neko Nitta
 Rabbit Miu
 Riko Kaiju
 Rina Amikura
 Rina Shingaki 
 Rina Yamashita 
 Risa Sera
 Rydeen Hagane
 Sachie Abe
 Saki
 Sakura Hirota
 Saori Anou 
 Sareee
 Sawako Shimono
 Sayaka Obihiro
 Sumika Yanagawa
 Suzu Suzuki
 Tae Honma 
 Tequila Saya 
 Thekla
 Tsukushi Haruka 
 Yako Fujigasaki
 Yuki Mashiro 
 Yuko Sakurai
 Yuu Yamagata

Male

 Choun Shiryu
 Banana Senga
 Drew Parker
 Fuminori Abe
 Hartley Jackson 
 Hideki Suzuki 
 Isami Kodaka
 Jun Kasai
 Koju Takeda
 Masashi Takeda
 Minoru Fujita
 Takayuki Ueki
 Tank Nagai
 Toshiyuki Sakuda
 Violento Jack
 Yasu Urano
 Yuko Miyamoto
 Yoshihisa Uto

Referees

Broadcast team

Backstage personnel

Championships

Active

Formerly promoted

References

External links

 Ice Ribbon official site in Japanese

 
Japanese women's professional wrestling promotions
2006 establishments in Japan
Sport in Saitama Prefecture
Entertainment companies established in 2006